Palaeoelachista is an extinct genus of moths in the family Elachistidae. It was described by Kozlov in 1987. It contains the species P. traugottolseni, which was described from Baltic amber in the Russian Federation. It is dated to the Eocene.

References

†
Eocene insects
Prehistoric insects of Europe
Fossil taxa described in 1987
Fossil Lepidoptera
†